The School of Toronto Dance Theatre is a dance school located in the Cabbagetown neighbourhood of Toronto, Ontario, Canada. Established in 1968, the School today runs under the Artistic Direction of Sasha Ivanochko and is a national leader for performing arts education, at the forefront of training in contemporary dance.

History 
The School was established in 1968 by the founders of Toronto Dance Theatre: Patricia Beatty, David Earle, and Peter Randazzo, disciples of Martha Graham.  In January 1978, after a decade of growth, the School incorporated separately from the company.  In 1979 the Professional Training Program was established by David Earle, and together the company and School moved into the studios and offices of their current home in Cabbagetown. Today the School maintains its affiliation with Toronto Dance Theatre, currently under the artistic direction of Christopher House.

Programs offered
The School of Toronto Dance Theatre comprises four divisions:

Professional Training Program (PTP)
The School offers a full-time, three-year program in contemporary dance. The professional program is a post-secondary course of study aimed at training aspiring dancers in the skills and experience to succeed in a theatrical dance career. This program is uniquely linked to the York University dance department, giving students the opportunity to apply for admission to the York Bachelor of Fine Arts (Hons) Dance program.

Summer School in Contemporary Dance
The Summer School is an intensive 2-week program of classes in contemporary dance designed for professionals, pre-professionals, and students with a strong background in dance.

Young Dancers' Program (YDP)
A non-competitive program designed to introduce children and young people (up to the age of 17) to creative movement and contemporary dance.

Contemporary Dance Classes
The School also runs an adult recreational program of contemporary dance classes, offered for different experience levels, held on Tuesday evenings.

Faculty and affiliations
The School's artistic director is Sasha Ivanochko, and the faculty are all practising artists.

The School is affiliated with Toronto Dance Theatre, whose artistic director is Christopher House, and many graduates of the school have become members of that company.

A number of graduates of the School have gone on to join major Canadian and international companies, whilst others have initiated their own dance collectives, festivals and schools.

The School is also affiliated with York University, in Toronto, and graduates may apply credits from their courses at the school towards a BFA in dance.

Notable alumni
 Emily St. John Mandel studied contemporary dance at STDT from the age of 18.

References

External links
The School of Toronto Dance Theatre

Dance schools in Canada
Education in Toronto
Educational institutions established in 1968
1968 establishments in Ontario